Sir John Randolph (1693 – March 7, 1737) was an American politician. He was a Speaker of the House of Burgesses, an Attorney General for the Colony of Virginia, and the youngest son of William Randolph and Mary Isham.

Early life
Randolph was born in Charles City County, Virginia. He was the youngest son of William Randolph and Mary (née Isham) Randolph. He was a grand-uncle of U.S. President Thomas Jefferson.

Randolph later reflected, "I should have been an atheist if it had not been for one recollection—and that was the memory of the time when my departed mother used to take my little hand in hers and cause me on my knees to say, 'Our Father who art in heaven.'"

He attended the College of William & Mary and completed his studies in 1711.

Career
In 1712, the Lieutenant Governor of Virginia, Alexander Spotswood, appointed Randolph as Deputy Attorney General for Charles City County, Prince George County, and Henrico County. On May 17, 1715, Randolph was admitted to Gray's Inn at the Inns of Court, then called to the bar on November 25, 1717.

Randolph was the only native of Colonial Virginia to receive a knighthood.

Personal life

Randolph married Susanna Beverley (the daughter of Peter Beverley, a Speaker of the House of Burgesses and Treasurer of Virginia, and Elizabeth Peyton, and sister of Elizabeth Beverley, the wife of his brother William Randolph II) around 1718. Together, the couple lived at Tazewell Hall, and had at least four children who reached adulthood:

 Beverley Randolph (1719–1764), who married Agatha Wormeley (1721–1786) in 1742.
 Mary Randolph (1720–1768), who married Col. Philip Ludwell Grymes (1721–1761), a member of the Virginia House of Burgesses, in 1742.
 Peyton Randolph (1721–1775), the first and third president of the Continental Congress, who married Elizabeth Harrison.
 John Randolph (1727–1784), who married Ariana Jennings in 1750.

He died in 1737 and was interred at the chapel of the Wren Building at the College of William & Mary.  His will had been witnessed in 1735 by Charles Bridges.

See also
First Families of Virginia
Randolph family of Virginia

Ancestry

References

External links

1693 births
1737 deaths
People from Henrico County, Virginia
John
Speakers of the Virginia House of Burgesses
College of William & Mary alumni
Beverley family of Virginia
People from Charles City County, Virginia
Knights Bachelor
Burials at the College of William & Mary